

History
The New England Hockey Conference men's tournament began as the 'ECAC East Tournament' in 1985, a year after ECAC 2 downgraded to Division III and during the season where the conference formally split into two separate entities. For most of its existence the tournament was an 8-team format but on occasion the top seed would receive a bye into the semifinal round. For a few years during the late 1990s the tournament was expanded to include 10 teams but this was abandoned when nine teams left to form the ice hockey division of the NESCAC. Beginning with the 2004 tournament, the top seeded team to reach the semifinal round served as host for all semifinal and championship games regardless of their participation. This arrangement was abandoned after the 2013 tournament and the final two rounds were placed on different weekends. The 2021 tournament was cancelled due to the COVID-19 pandemic.

1985

Note: * denotes overtime period(s)

1986

Note: * denotes overtime period(s)

1987

Note: * denotes overtime period(s)

1988

Note: * denotes overtime period(s)

1989

Note: * denotes overtime period(s)

1990

Note: * denotes overtime period(s)

1991

Note: * denotes overtime period(s)

1992

Note: * denotes overtime period(s)

1993

Note: * denotes overtime period(s)

1994

Note: Williams passed on the ECAC tournament in order to play in the NCAA tournament.

Note: * denotes overtime period(s)

1995

Note: Middlebury passed on the ECAC tournament in order to play in the NCAA tournament.

Note: * denotes overtime period(s)

1996

Note: Middlebury, Colby and Bowdoin passed on the ECAC tournament in order to play in the NCAA tournament.

Note: * denotes overtime period(s)

1997

Note: Middlebury passed on the ECAC tournament in order to play in the NCAA tournament.

Note: * denotes overtime period(s)

1998

Note: Middlebury and Williams passed on the ECAC tournament in order to play in the NCAA tournament.

Note: * denotes overtime period(s)

1999

Note: Middlebury and Amherst passed on the ECAC tournament in order to play in the NCAA tournament.

Note: * denotes overtime period(s)

2000

Note: * denotes overtime period(s)

2001

Note: * denotes overtime period(s)

2002

Note: * denotes overtime period(s)

2003

Note: * denotes overtime period(s)

2004

Note: As the top seed, Norwich served as host for the semifinal and championship rounds.

Note: * denotes overtime period(s)

2005

Note: As the top seed in the semifinal, Norwich served as host for the semifinal and championship rounds.

Note: * denotes overtime period(s)

2006

Note: As the top seed in the semifinal, Norwich served as host for the semifinal and championship rounds.

Note: * denotes overtime period(s)

2007

Note: As the top seed in the semifinal, Norwich served as host for the semifinal and championship rounds.

Note: * denotes overtime period(s)

2008

Note: As the top seed in the semifinal, Norwich served as host for the semifinal and championship rounds.

Note: * denotes overtime period(s)

2009

Note: As the top seed in the semifinal, New England College served as host for the semifinal and championship rounds.

Note: * denotes overtime period(s)

2010

Note: As the top seed in the semifinal, Norwich served as host for the semifinal and championship rounds.

Note: * denotes overtime period(s)

2011

Note: As the top seed in the semifinal, Norwich served as host for the semifinal and championship rounds.

Note: * denotes overtime period(s)

2012

Note: As the top seed in the semifinal, Norwich served as host for the semifinal and championship rounds.

Note: * denotes overtime period(s)

2013

Note: As the top seed in the semifinal, Norwich served as host for the semifinal and championship rounds.

Note: * denotes overtime period(s)

2014

Note: * denotes overtime period(s)

2015

Note: * denotes overtime period(s)

2016

Note: * denotes overtime period(s)

2017

Note: * denotes overtime period(s)

2018

Note: * denotes overtime period(s)

2019

Note: * denotes overtime period(s)

2020

Note: * denotes overtime period(s)

2022

Note: * denotes overtime period(s)

2023

Note: * denotes overtime period(s)

Championships

Current teams

Former teams

See also
 ECAC 2 Tournament

References

Ice hockey
New England Hockey Conference
Recurring sporting events established in 1985
1985 establishments in the United States